Phrynomedusa vanzolinii, or Vanzolini's leaf frog, is a frog in the subfamily Phyllomedusinae. It is endemic to southeastern Brazil where it is currently known from Teresópolis in the state of Rio de Janeiro and Boraceia in the state of São Paulo, Brazil. It probably occurs more widely than current records suggest, especially in areas between the two known sites. It is possible that this species is a synonym of Phrynomedusa appendiculata.

Etymology
The specific name vanzolinii honors Paulo Vanzolini, a Brazilian herpetologist and composer.

Description
Adult males measure  and females—based on the only known specimen— in snout–vent length. The body is slender. The tympanum is visible. Skin on dorsum and limbs is smooth. The webbing between fingers and toes is reduced. The upper surfaces are green or violet brown. There is a narrow, oblique orange stripe running from the posterior border of eye to the arm insertion. The venter is immaculate.

Habitat and conservation
Tadpoles have been found in small pools in permanent streams. It is threatened by habitat degradation. However, this species is classified as data deficient, meaning more data are needed on the species for categorization by the IUCN Red List of Threatened Species. Its population trend was unknown at the last assessment.

References

vanzolinii
Endemic fauna of Brazil
Amphibians of Brazil
Amphibians described in 1991
Taxonomy articles created by Polbot